Cennet'in Gözyaşları is a Turkish drama television series that aired on ATV from September 24, 2017 to June 17, 2018. It is based on the South Korean series titled Tears of Heaven.

Plot 
Cennet was abandoned by her mother as a newborn and her grandmother took care of her. Despite her humble upbringing and lack of financial resources, she becomes a brilliant architect and achieves her dream job at a prestigious architecture firm. Cennet is unexpectedly reunited with Selim, her childhood friend who also works in the firm, and her biological mother Arzu, who disappeared from her life and has now come to disrupt her world. Melisa is a second daughter of Arzu from another relationship, and she becomes very jealous about the increasing relationship of Cennet and Selim but at last she realizes that Selim would never love her and she leaves them alone.

Cast 
 Berk Atan as Selim Arısoy
 Almila Ada as Cennet Yılmaz
 Esra Ronabar as Arzu Soyer
 Yusuf Akgün as Orhan Soyer
 Zehra Yılmaz as Melisa Soyer
 Şencan Güleryüz as Cengiz Arısoy
 Hazım Körmükçü as Mahir Soyer
 Ebru Nil Aydın as Sema Soyer
 Çiçek Acar as Nilgün Arısoy 
 Süeda Çil as Suna Gürsu 
 Ebru Destan as Özlem Arısoy
 Sude Nur Yazıcı as Beste Tuna
 Oktay Çubuk as Ömer Gürsu
 Güler Ökten as Mukaddes Yılmaz
 Ali İpin as Rıza Soyer

References

External links 
 

2017 Turkish television series debuts
2018 Turkish television series endings
Turkish drama television series
Turkish television soap operas
Turkish-language television shows
Turkish television series based on South Korean television series
ATV (Turkey) original programming
Television series produced in Istanbul
Television shows set in Istanbul
Television series set in the 2010s